Lakhimpur Lok Sabha constituency is one of the 14 Lok Sabha constituencies in Assam state in north-eastern India.

Assembly segments
Lakhimpur Lok Sabha constituency  is composed of the following assembly segments:

Members of Parliament

^ by poll

Election results

General election 2019

2016 by-election
A by-election was necessitated following the election of Sarbananda Sonowal as Chief Minister of Assam.

2014 result

General election 2009

See also
 Lakhimpur district
 List of Constituencies of the Lok Sabha

References

External links
Lakhimpur lok sabha  constituency election 2019 date and schedule

Lok Sabha constituencies in Assam
Lakhimpur district
Dhemaji district